Hostelling International USA (HI USA), also known as American Youth Hostels, Inc. (AYH), is a nonprofit organization that operates youth hostels and runs programs around those hostels. It is the official United States affiliate of Hostelling International (HI), also known as the International Youth Hostel Federation. It is incorporated as a not-for-profit organization, with its headquarters in Silver Spring, Maryland.

History
The first American youth hostel was opened in Northfield, Massachusetts in 1934 by Monroe and Isabel Smith, and American Youth Hostels was born. Within a year, a network of more than 30 hostels was operating throughout New England. In 1947 a preaching Quaker minister, Leslie "Barry" Barret and his wife, Winnifred, turned a rundown New England farm into a rustic retreat center and youth hostel and called it Friendly Crossways. Like Hidden Villa, Friendly Crossways attracted groups promoting peace and social justice. When Hidden Villa dropped out of the HI-USA system in 2010, Friendly Crossways became the longest continually operating hostel in the US.

Pre-war European political currents overshadowed much of the international movement in the late 1930s. During the war, parts of the European youth hostel system still continued to operate, as well as a small network of AYH hostels. Britain expanded its own hostel network, while Australia and New Zealand started their associations.

The end of the war brought a time of worldwide rebuilding and reflection. International youth travel was embraced by governments as a way of encouraging interaction and understanding, and avoiding future conflict.

In the 1960s and 1970s, the movement prospered. Public awareness and hostel use increased as student travel became even more widespread. New hostel facility standards, management training and more consistent operating policies improved the quality of the hostel stay. AYH also sponsored self-supported bicycle tours with overnights at its hostels to such places as the Midwest and Canadian Rockies. In the mid- to late-1960s, the New York chapter staged the "3 a.m. ride" through New York City. Riders began to assemble in Washington Square, around 1 a.m. and at 3, began to ride the deserted streets of Manhattan. Around dawn, the riders took the Staten Island ferry and ended the ride at a beach on Staten Island.

The 1980s marked a decade a growth for American Youth Hostels. Major association hostels were opened in Boston, San Francisco, Santa Monica, Seattle and Washington, DC. In 1986, AYH approved its first strategic plan which affirmed the importance of AYH hostels in major cities, as well as membership growth and hostel based programming. Both hostel overnights and membership grew throughout the decade.

The growth continued in hostel overnights throughout the 1990s, and hostel programming exploded as AYH councils and hostels expanded their program offerings.

IYHF positioned the international movement for growth in the mid 1990s with the adoption of a common name and logo, and new quality standards for its more than 4,500 hostels. As the U.S. affiliate of IYHF, AYH embraced "Hostelling International" and the blue triangle and adopted a more focused hostel quality program, becoming HI USA.

By the early 2000s, HI USA made quality a priority and steadily closed hostels over the next decade that didn’t meet the highest of standards.  The number of hostels went from 136 in 2001 to 53 in 2012.  However, hostel overnights have remained strong.  In fact, in 2012, HI USA hosted as many overnights across as its 53 hostels as it did in 2003 when it had 103 hostels.

During the slimming down of hostels, a new focus for HI USA took hold.  In 2008, the council model of governance - whereby 26 councils oversaw the majority of hostel operations – was questioned as the most effective model for moving forward.  After several years of intensive research, debate, and discussion, the councils voted on June 11, 2011, to dissolve their entities into  one unified, national organization, as a way to combine assets and resources to become a stronger organization.

By 2012, the process had begun and 14 councils became part of the unified organization by year’s end and HI USA had 53 hostels in its network.  The rest of the councils are expected to complete unification by the end of 2013, at which point HI-USA will have one national office, plus five regions; Northeast, Mid-Atlantic/Southeast, Central, Northwest, and Southwest.

Hostels
The flagship residence of the American Youth Hostels in the United States is in New York City, located in a landmark building designed by noted architect Richard Morris Hunt. This popular hostel occupies the entire east blockfront of Amsterdam Avenue between 103rd and 104th Streets within the Frederick Douglass Houses superblock in Manhattan.

Mission
The mission of HI USA is "to help all, especially the young, gain a greater understanding the world and its people through hostelling."

According to the HI USA website:

See also
 Backpacking (travel)

References

External links
 
 American Youth Hostel records, 1874–2012, University Archives and Special Collections, Joseph P. Healey Library, University of Massachusetts Boston

Adventure travel
Backpacking
Hostelling International member associations
Youth organizations based in Maryland